Niels Vink defeated Sam Schröder in the final, 7–5, 6–3 to win the quad singles wheelchair tennis title at the 2022 US Open. It was his first US Open singles title and second major singles title overall.

Dylan Alcott was the reigning champion, but retired from professional wheelchair tennis in January 2022.

Seeds

Draw

Finals

References

External links 
 Draw

Wheelchair Quad Singles
U.S. Open, 2022 Quad Singles